Mount Olive may refer to the following places in the U.S. state of Alabama:
Mount Olive, Barbour County, Alabama, a ghost town
Mount Olive, Blount County, Alabama, an unincorporated community
Mount Olive, Butler County, Alabama, an unincorporated community
Mount Olive, Calhoun County, Alabama, an unincorporated community
Mount Olive, Coosa County, Alabama, a census-designated place
Mount Olive, Dekalb County, Alabama, an unincorporated community
Mount Olive, Jefferson County, Alabama, a census-designated place
Mount Olive, Lauderdale County, Alabama, an unincorporated community
Mount Olive (ghost town), Lauderdale County, Alabama, a ghost town
Mount Olive, Marshall County, Alabama, an unincorporated community
Mount Olive, Randolph County, Alabama, an unincorporated community
Mount Olive, Tuscaloosa County, Alabama, an unincorporated community